The Hatcher Bluffs are a line of bluffs facing northwest, located  south of Metavolcanic Mountain, at the east side of Reedy Glacier, Antarctica. They were mapped by the United States Geological Survey from surveys and U.S. Navy air photos between 1960 and 1964, and were named by the Advisory Committee on Antarctic Names for Julius O. Hatcher, a construction mechanic at Byrd Station in 1962.

References

Cliffs of Marie Byrd Land